Georg Frederik Ferdinand Allen (1856–1925) was a Danish singing teacher, conductor and composer. He was the brother of musician Robert William Otto Allen.

A pupil of Gustav Helsted, he later studied in Paris and London. He was then a singing teacher in Copenhagen and during 1888 to 1892 a teacher at a conservatory in New York City and the singer at Trinity Church. He conducted for various singing organizations in Copenhagen: including the Artisans' Association choir and the Forsvarsbrøcrenes Mason choir.

References
Dansk Biografisk Leksikon

Male composers
Danish conductors (music)
Male conductors (music)
1856 births
1925 deaths
20th-century Danish musicians
19th-century Danish composers
20th-century Danish composers
20th-century conductors (music)
20th-century Danish male musicians
19th-century Danish male musicians
Danish expatriates in France
Danish expatriates in the United Kingdom